Worlds of the Imperium is a science fiction novel by American writer Keith Laumer.
It originally appeared in Fantastic Stories of the Imagination between February and April 1961. The following year it was published by Ace Books as an Ace Double with Seven from the Stars by Marion Zimmer Bradley.  It is an example of an alternate history novel in which a man from our reality becomes involved with another parallel world in which the American Revolution never happened and the secret of inter-world travel came under the control of the British Empire, which forged a unified Imperial world-state known as the Imperium.

Plot summary
Brion Bayard, an American diplomat on assignment in Stockholm, Sweden, attempts to evade a man following him, only to find himself kidnapped by agents of the Imperium from a parallel world. Taken to the home world of the Imperium, he is introduced to the aristocratic members of the government, which rules most of the civilized world from London, having been formed by the union of the British Empire, which included America, and the German and Austro-Hungarian empires of Europe, with neutral Sweden added as an impartial component of the mixture. He is impressed by the commitment to duty of the Imperial officials he meets and drawn to a particularly noble lady. Surprisingly, the Imperial officials also include an analogue of Hermann Göring who – as Nazi Germany never existed – is a fairly honest and decent person, completely free of the crimes he would have committed in our history,

The main reason for Bayard's abduction, however, is that the Imperium is under attack from another parallel world.

The Maxoni-Cocini drive, invented in the Imperium universe by Italian scientists/experimenters Giulio Maxoni and Carlo Cocini at the end of the 19th century, is the technology for traveling between worlds and is extremely dangerous. Only if several sensitive parameters are tuned exactly can disaster be avoided and the trans-world transportation effect be achieved. Almost all worlds where its development is attempted or even inadvertently stumbled upon are destroyed, often in bizarre and horrible ways.

The collection of time lines where such disasters have occurred is known as the Blight, and the rare ones where the Earth survives are known as Blight Insulars, or BIs. BI-1 is the Imperium, where, by rare chance, the Maxoni-Cocini drive was successfully developed. The Imperium has become rich and powerful by trading with time lines beyond the Blight. BI-3 is Bayard's home world, where the technology never developed. The raids are coming from BI-2, a chaotic world where Imperial Germany won the First World War but failed to consolidate its victory, with a chaotic and highly destructive war continuing to sweep the planet for generations. This world, which was not believed to have the Maxoni-Cocini drive until it became the origin of increasingly destructive raids, is currently ruled by a dictator, who happens to be an analogue of... Brion Bayard.

Bayard undergoes extensive training to substitute for his double, presumably after killing him, and take over the other government, shutting off the raids. The plan falls through almost as soon as he arrives in the new world. For some reason, almost nobody believes in his impersonation. The reason becomes apparent when he meets the other Bayard, who had lost both legs in a battle years before, but who has concealed that fact from the public.

However, this other Bayard is not the evil dictator he is portrayed to be. He greets his double as a brother, and tells him how, after being a military officer dedicated to saving the soldiers under his command, he became a dictator after the government he served disintegrated, and undertook an effort to save what was left of shattered  world. He is based in Algiers, which was less damaged than other parts of the world, and used the remnants of the former French Colonial Government as the nucleus of his fledgling World Government.  He knows nothing of the raids on the Imperium. The two Bayards talk over a gourmet meal and discover they have much in common, including similar histories.

Bayard the dictator is abruptly assassinated by the real conspirators, who are working for power-hungry factions in the Imperium itself, using stolen technology. Bayard himself is scheduled for a showy execution, after suitable amputation surgery, to allow the conspiracy to consolidate its hold on their world by publicly eliminating the dictator. Eventually he is able to escape back to the Imperium and expose the conspirators. Offered a chance to return to his Earth, or become a high-ranking Imperium officer, he looks at the noble lady who has become so important to him, and declares, "Home is where the heart is."

Sequels
There are three sequels to this novel.  They are The Other Side of Time (1965), Assignment in Nowhere (1968), and Zone Yellow (1990).

Related works
The collection A Century of Science Fiction contains a vignette by Laumer titled Worlds of the Imperium (Extract), which does not appear in the published novel.  It depicts a scene of a man with a hoe standing over a plant, and describes the eerie and horrific changes as the same scene shifts across parallel universes.  The man becomes an armored beast as the plant becomes ever more hostile and ferocious, and then by degrees the scene shifts back to a man, albeit with green skin and horns, standing with a hoe.  The scene may have been inspired by the well-known painting and poem.

See also

 Crosstime Traffic
 The Timeliner Trilogy
 Timeline Wars series

References

External links

1961 American novels
1961 science fiction novels
American science fiction novels
American alternate history novels
American steampunk novels
Ace Books books
Novels about parallel universes
Works by Keith Laumer
Novels set in Stockholm
Novels set in Algeria